Daniel Arturo Prieto Solimano (born 19 September 1995) is a Peruvian footballer who plays as a goalkeeper.

References

External links 
 

1995 births
Living people
Peruvian footballers
Peruvian expatriate footballers
Peru under-20 international footballers
Association football goalkeepers
Peruvian Primera División players
2015 South American Youth Football Championship players
Rayo Vallecano players
Club Alianza Lima footballers
Cienciano footballers
Deportivo Municipal footballers
Peruvian expatriate sportspeople in Spain
Expatriate footballers in Spain